Jerrie is a feminine given name. Notable people with the name include:

 Jerrie Cobb (born 1931), American aviator
 Jerrie Mock (born 1925), American aviator

Jerrie is also known as the ship name for Perrie Edwards and Jade Thirlwall of Little Mix. The pair are believed to have has a romanic relationship  however it was never confirmed.

Feminine given names